Bharat Ane Nenu is a 2018 Indian Telugu-language political drama film written and directed by Koratala Siva. The film stars Mahesh Babu and Kiara Advani (in her Telugu debut), alongside a supporting cast including Prakash Raj, R. Sarathkumar, Aamani, Devaraj, Posani Krishna Murali, P. Ravi Shankar, Yashpal Sharma, Rao Ramesh, and Brahmaji. The music was composed by Devi Sri Prasad, while A. Sreekar Prasad edited the film.

The plot follows Bharat, an Oxford university student who returns to India following the demise of his father, the chief minister of Andhra Pradesh (United Andhra Pradesh). Disillusioned by the corruption he encounters, Bharat decides to bring about a change in the system after becoming the new chief minister, eventually facing controversies and making enemies.

The film was released theatrically on 20 April 2018 with positive reviews from critics praising Siva's direction, storyline, social message, DSP's music and score and cast performances (especially those of Babu, Advani and Prakash Raj). Bharat Ane Nenu grossed between 187.6–225 crore at the box office and declared as commercial hit.

Plot
  
Bharath Ram, a brilliant and curious student, graduates with his 5th degree from Oxford. After celebrating, his uncle tells him that his father Raghava Rao, Chief Minister of Andhra Pradesh died from a stroke. Bharath flies home and reminisces.

As a child, Bharath spent most of his time with his mother and best friend Subhash next door as his father was busy setting up a political party with his best friend Varadarajulu, the party president who's also Bharath's uncle. After breaking a small promise, his mother scolds him and tells him about the importance of commitments. She dies in her sleep afterwards, impacting Bharath immensely. Raghava Rao then takes care of him at home, but Varadarajulu tells him that he must prepare for the upcoming elections and suggests he remarry to give Bharath a new mother. He agrees, having another child, Siddharth, with his new wife. Bharath's attempts to bond with his stepmother fail, so he spends more time at Subhash's house. Soon, Subhash's parents get jobs in London, and Bharat wants to go with them. After some time Raghava Rao agrees.

After the flashback, Bharath arrives in India and attends his father's mourning amid heavy media attention. Varadarajulu tells Bharath that his father had to be hospitalized due to the cold and that the final rites were completed by Siddharth because of Raghava Rao's death caused public disarray and they couldn't wait for him. Raghava Rao's death caused speculation over who the next Chief Minister will be. Bharath then drives around the city and gets frustrated by the chaotic atmosphere. Varadarajulu introduces him to many politicians, including opposition party leader Sripathi Rao and his son Manohar. As Bharath prepares to return to London, Varadarajulu cancels his ticket, explaining that he should be the next CM. Bharath objects and asks Varadarajulu to accede instead, but he opposes based on his position and intra-party conflict. Bharat reluctantly agrees and becomes CM despite his inexperience. However, his strict policies and novel ideas restore law and order and become popular with the public, earning the opposition's ire. One day, he sees a girl named Vasumathi and instantly falls in love with her. Bharath surprises Vasumathi by calling her and asks her out about, kindling romance. Later, he finds out that many politicians are laundering money and tries to expose Manohar. However, Varadarajulu stops the investigation and invites Bharath to the politicians' small party, where their collaboration and scheming surprise him. He decides to remove all this corruption from politics.

One day, Ramana and other youths come from Kakinada to meet Bharath. They cry out that their MLA, Rajendran from Bharat's party, was unhelpful and corrupt. Now a by-election has been scheduled, his son Raghu is contesting in it. Since Rajendran was brother of MP Damodaran, a senior leader in Bharath's party, the party has given seat to Raghu. the villagers are terribly upset as the ruling party's candidate is sure to win and hence have come to Bharath. Bharath tells Ramana to run against him as an independent candidate, and puts all state machinery to neutral position. Damu's henchmen kill many villagers in return, so Bharath sends undercover police officers to protect Ramana. Damu's police officers attempt to murder Ramana at his cinema hall, but Bharath arrives in time. Damu proclaims that Bharath is only powerful due to his bodyguards. After Bharath alone defeats his henchmen, Damu retreats. Bharath soon decides local governance must be instated, which succeeds despite the assembly's disapproval. However, Varadarajulu exposes Bharath's relationship with Vasumathi, causing a scandal and accusations of nepotism since she now works with him. Bharath resigns, Varadarajulu becomes Chief Minister, and Vasumathi and her father move to their native village.

Bharath arranges a press meet, where he attacks their sensationalism. The common people start to visit their MLAs and ask for Bharath to be reinstated as their Chief Minister again. Afterwards, his friend, ACP Krishna IPS, tells him that they have found a journalist named Mitra hiding in Brahmapur in the neighbouring state of Odisha. Bharath, along with his Security Officer Mukhtar, go there and learn that the journalist met with Raghava Rao before his death and proved Varadarajulu's corruption to him. At the same time, the ruling party's executive committee asks Varadarajulu to resign and bring back Bharath as CM. This irritates Varadarajulu and he plans to kill Bharat. As Bharath leaves the journalist's house, Mukthar gets shot in an ambush. Bharat takes him to a hospital and spots Varadarajulu's henchmen, so they escape again. Bharath eventually fights them in an abandoned area. As an army of goons shows up, the villagers arrive to protect him. They follow Bharath to Varadarajulu's office, where they face off.

Varadarajulu reveals that he tampered with Raghava Rao's medicines to slowly paralyze and kill him because Raghava started doubting on him since found out about Varadarajulu's corruption. Bharath gives 24 hours window for Varadarajulu to admit his crimes to the public and surrender. After he leaves, Varadarajulu commits suicide. The Legislature is dissolved, and Bharath's side wins in the election by Land-slide. All corrupt politicians from both sides are arrested, and Bharath takes office back as Chief Minister. The film ends with Bharath going with his family to Vasumathi's village residence, to propose marriage to her.

Cast

Production

Development

DVV Danayya announced that they would produce a film with Mahesh Babu directed by Koratala Siva in mid-2016. Devi Sri Prasad (DSP) was chosen to do the music for this film.

Casting
Kiara Advani played the role of the Chief Minister's girlfriend. Sarath Kumar was roped in to play the role of Mahesh Babu's father, and Prakash Raj signed in to play the role of antagonist.

Actor Devaraj, who played prominent antagonistic roles in Telugu cinemas in the first decade of the 21st century, was noted to appear in a Telugu film after a gap of 11 years through Bharat Ane Nenu, where he played the role of leader of the opposition party.

Crew

Stunt duo Ram-Laxman performed the stunt choreography for this film. The dance choreography was performed by Raju Sundaram, Dinesh Kumar, and Raghu.

Filming

"I Don't Know", the first South Indian song sung by Farhan Akhtar, was shot in Spain with Mahesh Babu and was choreographed by Raju Sundaram.

Soundtrack

The soundtrack of the film was composed by Devi Sri Prasad. The album features five songs, out of which three of them were released as singles. The first single "Bharat Ane Nenu" was released on 25 March 2018, at the occasion of Ram Navmi. The second single "I Don't Know" was launched on 1 April 2018.Farhan Akhtar lent his voice for the song "I Don't Know", which is first time for a South Indian movie. The third track "Vachaadayyo Swami", was released on 6 April 2018. The soundtrack was launched at the pre-release event which took place in the Lal Bahadur Shastri Stadium on 7 April 2018, with N. T. Rama Rao Jr. being the chief guest.

Release 
Bharat Ane Nenu was released theatrically on 20 April 2018, while the dubbed Tamil version titled Bharat Ennum Naan was released theatrically on 25 May 2018. It was later dubbed and released in Hindi as Dashing CM Bharath on 2 November 2018.

Reception

Critical reception 
Hemanth Kumar of Firstpost wrote "Mahesh Babu, Koratala Siva deliver an intense political drama". Kumar also said, "He (Siva) has shown yet again that there's plenty of drama when a normal guy takes an uncommon path. Bharat might have become the messiah of the state in the story, but it's Mahesh Babu who leaves a long lasting impression in the end. Two big thumbs up for the film. It delivers more than what it promises" giving 4 stars out of 5. Priyanka Sundar of Hindustan Times gave the film 3 stars out of 5, saying "Mahesh Babu as CM ushers in a new era. Mahesh Babu has the best of what commercial cinema has to offer – a strong subject, a tight film and a role he can chew on."

Suhas Yellapantula of The Times of India rated the 3.5 stars out of 5, mentioning "Bharat Ane Nenu gives you a lot to root for and provides a bang for your buck but lacks the finesse that makes for a good political thriller.". Sangeetha Devi Dundoo of The Hindu wrote, "This promise ticks the right boxes. Bharat Ane Nenu deserves a thumbs up for its well thought out plot and nuanced characters. Keeping us hooked to the narrative are Mahesh Babu, accompanied by Prakash Raj in another winsome and complex role, Rahul Ramakrishna, Rao Ramesh, Brahmaji and Kiara Advani among others. Kiara is impressive.".

Box office
Bharat Ane Nenu grossed between 187.6–225 crore in its full theatrical run including other versions like Tamil.

Awards and nominations

References

External links

2010s political drama films
Indian political drama films
Indian action drama films
2018 action drama films
Political action films
Films scored by Devi Sri Prasad
2018 films
Films about corruption in India
Films shot in Hyderabad, India
Films directed by Koratala Siva